Adolfo Margiotta (born 13 September 1957) is an Italian actor and comedian. He was born in Torre del Greco in the Province of Naples.

Filmography

Theatre
Permettete che vi legga il mio dramma?, di Anton P. Cechov, regia di Anna Laura Messeri
Le tre sorelle, di Anton P. Cechov, regia di Octomar Krejca
L'onesto Jago, di Corrado Augias, regia di Marco Sciaccaluga
L'Alcalde di Zalamea, di Calderon De La Barca, regia di Marco Sciaccaluga
La signorina Giulia, di August Strindberg, regia di Otomar Krejča
Jacques e il suo padrone, di Denis Diderot, regia di Luca Barbareschi
La putta onorata, di Carlo Goldoni, regia di Marco Sciaccaluga
La buona moglie, di Carlo Goldoni, regia di Marco Sciaccaluga
Marat Sade, di Peter Weiss, regia di Vanni Valenza
Il latte e il sangue, di Dario G. Martini, regia di B.Orsetti
La Congiura di Fiesco, di Friedrich Schiller, regia di Mario Menini
I Cimbelino, di William Shakespeare, regia di Renzo Trotta
La Commedia da due lire, di Paolo Rossi, regia di Giampiero Solari
Peggio che andar di notte, di Paolo Rossi, Massimo Olcese, Adolfo Margiotta, e Giampiero Solari, regia di Giampiero Solari
I paladini di Francia, di Giorgio Campanati, regia di Giorgio Campanati

Cinema
Peggio di così si muore, regia di Marcello Cesena (1995)
Velocipidi ai tropici, regia di David Riondino (1996)
In principio erano le mutande, regia di Anna Negri (1996)
La grande prugna, regia di Claudio Malaponti (1999)
Sulla spiaggia al di là del molo, regia di Giovanni Fago (2000)
E adesso sesso, regia di Carlo Vanzina (2001)
Brother Bear, voice of Tuke in Italian version (2003)
Balcancan, regia di Darko Mitrevski (2005)

Television
Avanzi Rai Tre regia di Franza Di Rosa (1992)
Tunnel Rai Tre regia di Franza Di Rosa (1993)
Producer - il Grande Gioco del Cinema Rai Tre regia di Franza Di Rosa (1995)
Pippo Chennedy Show Rai Due regia di Franza Di Rosa (1996)
Disokkupati Rai Due regia di Franza Di Rosa (1997)
Francamente me ne infischio Rai Uno regia di Paolo Beldì, con Adriano Celentano (1999)
Millennium Rai Uno, regia di Stefano Vicario (1999)
Ciao 2000 Rai Due (2000)

Cabaret
Tre Gabbiani, di Adolfo Margiotta, Massimo Olcese e Mauro Pagani, regia di A. Margiotta, M. Olcese e M. Pagani, (1989)
Vietato ai minori, di Adolfo Margiotta, Massimo Olcese, regia di Adolfo Margiotta (1990)

References

Italian male actors
Italian comedians
1957 births
Living people
People from Torre del Greco